Johannes "Jan" Vrolijk (March 21, 1917 – January 18, 1998) was a Dutch canoeist who competed in the 1936 Summer Olympics. He was born in Zaandam and died in Almelo.

In 1936 he finished ninth in the folding K-1 10000 m event.

References

1917 births
1998 deaths
Canoeists at the 1936 Summer Olympics
Dutch male canoeists
Olympic canoeists of the Netherlands
Sportspeople from Zaanstad
20th-century Dutch people